Annabelle Attanasio (born May 11, 1993) is an American actress and filmmaker of Italian descent. Best known as Cable McCory in Bull (2016-2018).

Career 
Attanasio was a member of the main cast of the CBS television legal drama Bull, co-created by her father, Paul Attanasio, when it originally premiered in 2016 (Season 1) and through Season 2 (2017-2018). She played Cable McCrory, the team's computer expert. On July 13, 2018, it was revealed that she would not be returning for season three, leaving for the opportunity to direct a feature film.

Her feature film, Mickey and the Bear, premiered at South by Southwest 2019. It premiered to critical acclaim, described as “a sharp, affecting film that's brimming with darkness and hope, every instant of it vividly alive,” by The Hollywood Reporter, and named one of Variety's Best Movies of SXSW. The Washington Post called the film “one of the most exciting breakout films of the year”, and RogerEbert.com sang the movie's praises, calling it “an almost perfectly realized drama that feels as if it was time-warped in from 40 or 50 years ago, in the tradition of great American cinema chamber pieces like ‘The Last Picture Show,’ ‘Alice Doesn't Live Here Anymore,’ ‘The Great Santini,’ and more recently, ‘Winter's Bone.’" It went on to make its international premiere at the Cannes Film Festival as a part of the Acid Official Selection and later played in competition at the Deauville American Film Festival, where it was distinguished by The New York Times as one of the standout films directed by a female filmmaker. It holds a 100% Fresh rating on Rotten Tomatoes.

Before starring in Bull, she played Dorothy Walcott in season 2 of the Cinemax drama The Knick. She also appeared in the Netflix original film Barry (2016).

Attanasio wrote, directed, and starred in a short film called Frankie Keeps Talking.

Filmography

Film

Television

References

External links 

 Official website
 

Living people
American television actresses
American people of Italian descent
California Democrats
American child actresses
1993 births
21st-century American actresses